Anolis kemptoni, or Kempton's anole, is a species of lizard in the family Dactyloidae. The species is native to Central America.

Etymology
The specific name, kemptoni, is in honor of American physician Kempton Potter Aiken Taylor, who was the younger brother of poet Conrad Aiken.

Geographic range
A. kemptoni is native to Costa Rica and Panama.

Reproduction
A. kemptoni is oviparous.

References

Further reading
Dunn ER (1940). "New and Noteworthy Herpetological Material from Panama". Proc. Acad. Nat. Sci. Philadelphia 92: 105–122. (Anolis kemptoni, new species).
Köhler G (2000). Reptilien und Amphibien Mittelamerikas, Band 1: Krokodile, Schildkröten, Echsen. Offenbach: Herpeton Verlag. 158 pp. (Norops kemptoni, new combination, p. 62). (in German).
Savage, Jay M.; Guyer, Craig (1998). "A new species of anole lizard, genus Norops (Squamata: Polychrotidae), from the Cordillera de Talamanca, Costa Rica". Revista de Biología Tropical 46 (3): 805–809. (Norops pandoensis, new species).

Kempton's
Reptiles of Panama
Reptiles of Costa Rica
Reptiles described in 1940
Taxa named by Emmett Reid Dunn